The 1939 Caerphilly by-election was a parliamentary by-election held on 4 July 1939 for the British House of Commons constituency of Caerphilly.

Previous MP
Morgan Jones was the previous member of Parliament. He died on 23 April 1939. He was a conscientious objector during the First World War.

Previous result

Candidates
Ness Edwards was a coal miner and during the first world war, a conscientious objector.
Ronald Bell was a barrister, and later became a politician.

Result

Aftermath

Notes and references

External links
 British Parliamentary Election Results 1918-1949, compiled and edited by F.W.S. Craig (The Macmillan Press 1979)

1939 elections in the United Kingdom
1939 in Wales
1930s elections in Wales
By-elections to the Parliament of the United Kingdom in Welsh constituencies
Caerphilly
Politics of Glamorgan